Alberico I Cybo-Malaspina (28 February 1534 – 18 January 1623) was the first Prince of Massa and Marquis of Carrara. He was also the last Count (1553–1619) and the first Duke of Ferentillo (1619–1623). 

Born in Genoa, Italy, he was the son of Lorenzo Cybo and Ricciarda Cybo-Malaspina (although probably born of his mother's adultery with her brother-in-law, Cardinal Innocenzo Cybo), and was a descendant of Pope Innocent VIII and Lorenzo de' Medici. 

In 1553 Alberico succeeded his mother as Marquis of Massa and Lord of Carrara, being later promoted, in 1568, to Prince and Marquis respectively  He was married twice, first to Elisabetta della Rovere, daughter of Francesco Maria I della Rovere, Duke of Urbino by whom he had one son, Alderano Cybo-Malaspina; and second to Isabella di Capua, by whom he had three daughters and a son. He also fathered five natural children. Cybo-Malaspina died in Massa after having reigned, beloved and respected, for nearly 70 years. Since his son Alderano had predeceased him, it was his grandson Carlo that succeeded him in the principality.

Notes

Sources

1534 births
1623 deaths
Italian princes